Michael Cowley (born 8 November 1941) is a former British cyclist. He competed in the individual road race and team time trial events at the 1964 Summer Olympics.

References

External links
 

1941 births
Living people
British male cyclists
Olympic cyclists of Great Britain
Cyclists at the 1964 Summer Olympics